The Department of the Premier and Cabinet is a department of the Queensland Government. It is responsible for advising and supporting the Premier and Cabinet, and for managing the state's public sector alongside the Public Service Commission.

The department's headquarters are at 1 William Street in the Brisbane CBD.

Structure
The department reports to the Premier and is administered by its Director-General, Dave Stewart. The department has five divisions:
Strategy and Engagement
Policy Division
Corporate Government Services
Cabinet Services
Office of the Queensland Parliamentary Counsel

Publications 
The department's annual reports from 2012/2013 to present are available.

See also

 Premiers of the Australian states

Past Director-Generals 
A list of the heads of the Department from 1859 to 2001 is available.

References

External links
The Department of the Premier and Cabinet
Queensland Cabinet and Ministers Website
The Premier of Queensland
Portfolio chart and organisation chart

Premier and Cabinet